is a Japanese light novel series written by Sadanatsu Anda, with illustrations by Shiromizakana. It centers around five high school students facing numerous supernatural phenomena that forces them to reveal secrets that will test their bonds with each other. The series includes 11 volumes published by Enterbrain between January 2010 and September 2013. Two manga adaptations have been published by Enterbrain and Kadokawa Shoten. A 13-episode anime adaptation directed by Shinya Kawatsura, written by Fumihiko Shimo, and produced by Silver Link aired in Japan between July and September 2012. Four additional episodes aired on December 30, 2012. The Kokoro Connect franchise was localized in North America by several companies: Seven Seas Entertainment licensed the manga, Sentai Filmworks the anime, and J-Novel Club the light novel series.

Plot
The story primarily involves five high school students — Taichi, Iori, Himeko, Yoshifumi, and Yui — who are all the only members of the Student Cultural Research Club at the high school they attend. They all face various supernatural, sense-altering phenomena in their daily lives, all seemingly caused by a cryptic entity which refers to itself as 'Heartseed', who is intent on using the phenomena to test the characters for an unknown goal. As the five undergo these phenomena, the strength of their bonds will be tested.

Characters

Main characters

 Taichi is the main protagonist and a big professional wrestling fan. He and four others formed the cultural club because their school did not have the club they wanted to join. He is generally selfless and will usually try to help others in need. He confesses his love to Iori in the Hito Random arc, however he gets rejected since it was believed she was going to "die." They do start a relationship but break up very shortly after because Iori believed Taichi did not know the real "her". During the events of Michi Random, his feelings began to change and he confesses to Himeko by the end of the series.

 Iori is the easy going president of the cultural club. She lives alone with her mother who is seldom at home. Having previously had a violent stepfather, she had learned to alter her personality to fit the expectations of others to the point where she is unsure who she was originally supposed to be. She is in love with Taichi, but decides to postpone their relationship until the phenomena was over. In Kizu Random, she finds out that Himeko has feelings for Taichi, too; Iori confronts her and later encourages her to confess to him. By the end of the Kako Random arc, she starts to question whether or not she has feelings for Taichi and if people really know the real her; throughout the course of the series, their feelings toward each other change back into friendship and they do not date again, though they remain happy that they fell in love with each other. She is controlled several times by Heartseed when a phenomenon is about to end.

 Himeko is the vice president of the cultural club, who has a contrasting personality with Iori. She often reacts violently to Taichi or Yoshifumi's jokes, and is nicknamed "Inaban" by Iori. She was a computer club member but quit after having an argument with the president of that club, and then joined the cultural club. She is generally distrustful of others and worries a lot, even more so when they begin swapping bodies. Between them, she is the most calm and rational when dealing with unexpected situations. During Kizu Random, Heartseed confronts her in coming to the realization that she has feelings for Taichi when she was pretending she did not know. She confesses to him after the class trip by the encouragement of Iori, declaring that she would make him fall for her even if he was in love with Iori. Over the course of the series, she gets more and more attached to the group, especially Taichi, and softens her sharp and rational personality. In the end of the Michi Random arc, she starts dating Taichi and at the end of the light novels, they are still a couple.

 Yui is a close friend of Himeko, who initially applied to be a member of the Fancy Club before finding out that it was defunct, joining the cultural club as a last resort. She is skilled in karate but developed an extreme androphobia after she was almost raped in junior high school. She starts having a different opinion of boys after Taichi helps her, and as the series progresses, she grows to trust him and Yoshifumi as they help her combat her greatest fears. She has rejected Yoshifumi numerous times, but she later admits that she is just not yet ready to have a relationship. She overcomes her androphobia after Yoshifumi reaffirms his love for her, and the two start dating near the end of the series.

 Yoshifumi is Taichi's best friend with whom he often shares adult videos with. His perverted attitude led him to believe that there was a real "Player's Club" at the school, dedicated to taking lewd photos of the school's female population. While having a non-serious attitude, he loves Yui and does not hesitate to show it seriously. As a kid, he vowed to live life to the fullest after a student he knew died; however, this also leads to difficulties in communicating with others as he isolated himself for a long time after. Throughout the series, his communication improves as he opens up more and more to Yui. He is considered as the weakest of the five by Heartseed, but generally has the clearest head on his shoulders of any member of the group; this, however, also causes him to overreact and make foolish mistakes while trying too hard to help people.

Chihiro is one of two freshmen that joins the cultural club. He was given a power by Heartseed called Illusory Projection, which allows him to transform into anyone by having the same physical traits of the person including their scent and voice.

Shino is one of two freshmen that joins the cultural club. She is in love with Chihiro.

A supernatural being who is the cause of the phenomena surrounding the cultural club. It communicates with the group by possessing other humans, most often Mr. Gotō, and often speaks in a tired monotone voice. Its name comes from the balloon plant, whose seeds have heart-shaped patterns. There are actually two Heartseeds, the first who refers to itself with "boku" while another who uses "watashi", which possibly means that the first is a male and second is a female.

Yamaboshi High School

Class 1-3's representative who has romantic feelings for Iori. She considers Taichi a rival but will occasionally support him.

Class 1-3's homeroom teacher and cultural club advisor, who is often possessed by Heartseed. He also moderates the jazz club. He occasionally gives advice to the club in the form of moral teaching.

Taichi, Iori, and Himeko's classmate. He has a crush on Maiko.

 Taichi, Iori, and Himeko's classmate who is nicknamed "Prince" in his class and his jazz club. He had a crush on Iori, but was quickly declined, mostly due to him asking during the period when Iori was isolated from the class.

Class 2-2's representative in the second year of the story. In Michi Random, she has a crush on Shōto. When Iori rejected Shōto, she got angry and made several rumors about Iori, and hired some miscreants from other schools to ruin the cultural club's presentation. Ironically, while being blamed by the miscreants for the kidnapping of Inaban, she ends up becoming friends with Iori, changing her appearance, physical and mental, to be more tame and nice.

 and 
 (Mihara) and Kanako Nomura (Mikitani)
 Two friends of Kaoru. They egg her on to tear up and ruin the cultural club's presentation, and are responsible for misguiding the thoughts of Kaoru but are not seen after Michi Random.

Iori's best friend who is a calligraphy club member.

Yui's friend.

Others

An old karate rival of Yui's who appears to be hung up over a certain promise Yui apparently made.

Yoshifumi's old girlfriend whom he dated in middle school before she moved to Sendai. Her appearance is similar to that of Yui's when Yoshifumi was in middle school, but she cut her hair after moving away.

Yui's younger sister.

Taichi's elementary school age younger sister. She often gives advice to her brother about love. Like Ryūzen and Iori, she is sometimes controlled by Heartseed, but a different one from the Heartseed the cultural club members know of.

Iori's single parent. She has dated five different men, but has only been married to three out of the five.

Media

Light novels
Kokoro Connect began as a light novel series written by Sadanatsu Anda, with illustrations by Yukiko Horiguchi under the pen name Shiromizakana. Anda entered the first novel in the series, originally titled , into Enterbrain's 11th Entertainment Awards in 2009 and the novel won the Special Prize. The first volume, renamed Kokoro Connect Hito Random, was published on January 30, 2010 under Enterbrain's Famitsu Bunko imprint. The main series ended with the tenth release of the novels on March 30, 2013, and a side-story collection was released on September 30, 2013. During their panel at Anime Expo 2018, J-Novel Club announced that they have licensed the light novel.

Manga
A manga adaptation illustrated by Cuteg was serialized in Enterbrain's Famitsu Comic Clear online manga magazine between October 22, 2010 and August 23, 2013. Enterbrain published five tankōbon volumes between May 14, 2011 and September 14, 2013. Seven Seas Entertainment began releasing the series in North America in August 2014. A second manga based on the anime adaptation, illustrated by Na! and titled Kokoro Connect On Air, was serialized between the August 2012 and April 2013 issues of Kadokawa Shoten's Nyantype magazine. A single volume was released on March 30, 2013. Enterbrain published two volumes of an anthology titled Magi-Cu 4-koma Kokoro Connect on July 25 and September 25, 2012.

Drama CDs
Enterbrain released a drama CD titled  on February 16, 2011. A second drama CD titled  was released on January 6, 2012.

Anime
An anime adaptation was directed by Shinya Kawatsura and produced by Silver Link. The anime's screenplay is written by Fumihiko Shimo, the character designs are by Toshifumi Akai, and the sound director is Toshiki Kameyama. The cast is the same with the drama CD cast. Of the 17 episodes, the first 13 were aired in Japan between July 8 and September 30, 2012 and were also simulcast by Crunchyroll. The four remaining episodes aired on AT-X on December 30, 2012. The anime was released on seven Blu-ray Disc (BD)/DVD compilation volumes between October 24, 2012 and April 24, 2013. Sentai Filmworks licensed the series in North America and released the first 13 episodes on BD/DVD on October 22, 2013, and the remaining four on December 10, 2013. Hanabee has licensed the series in Australia.

The anime has seven pieces of theme music: three opening themes and four ending themes. Junca Amaoto for the first five episodes. The second ending theme is "Cry Out" by Team Nekokan feat. Atsuko for episodes six through ten. The third ending theme is "Salvage" by Team Nekokan feat. Rekka Katakiri for episodes 11 through 13. The fourth ending theme is "I scream Chocolatl" by Team Nekokan feat. Lia for episodes 14 through 17. An insert song titled  sung by Sayuri Horishita was used in episode 17.

Allegation of bullying during promotion 
At an advance screening of the anime series on June 24, 2012, voice actor Mitsuhiro Ichiki had supposedly auditioned for a character role and was invited to the event to allegedly be announced as a surprise cast member. It was then revealed at the event that Ichiki was to in fact be chosen as head of public relations, with his audition revealed to be a candid-camera style fake. While Ichiki accepted the role as head of PR, criticism of the event led to a flow of criticism directed towards the staff and voice actors involved on blog websites and Twitter accounts, as well as people not directly involved. The staff of the show posted an official statement on September 2, 2012 apologizing for "insufficient consideration regarding performers" leading to "widespread discomfort and misunderstanding," promising to seriously reflect on the incident in the future. They had also cancelled the Internet radio program Kokoro Connect Bunken Shinbun as a result. Ichiki also posted a statement the same day, mentioning how he felt no ill will towards the staff as a result of the incident and denies any bullying or harassment taking place.

Episode list

Visual novel
A visual novel developed by Banpresto and published by Namco Bandai Games under the title  was released on the PlayStation Portable on November 22, 2012.

Reception
Theron Martin of Anime News Network (ANN) published a positive review covering the first eight episodes of the anime series. Despite finding criticism in the "erratic artistic merits" of the show's overall aesthetic and the resolution of issues being handled "too easily and simply", he gave praise to the main cast for their deep characterizations, the first two arcs having "a good balance of light humor and varying degrees of drama" (singling out the second arc as the strongest), and the voice actors for conveying their characters during the first arc's body switching moments, concluding that: "Kokoro Connect is not an outstanding series so far, but it exploits its defining gimmicks effectively enough to avoid being labeled as a heavily-derivative, run-of-the-mill one." Bamboo Dong reviewed the home video release for the same website in 2013. While commending the show's premise for having its characters confront personal problems through imaginative scenarios and the talents of the English voice actors, he criticized the writers for utilizing "lazy storytelling and [lazy] conflict resolution" when dealing with various societal issues, concluding that: "Kokoro Connect is a fine little series for what it is, but it could have been magnificent."

Carlos Ross, writing for THEM Anime Reviews, reviewed the TV series and its continuation Michi Random: He was critical of Heartseed as the catalyst for the supernatural events feeling "contrived, artificial or outright cringeworthy" but was positive towards the "impressive character work" of the ensemble cast and their interactions with each other being "realistically fluid and constantly evolving" like real-life relationships. Ross wrote that despite a "superfluous" subplot, the underutilization of Yui and Yoshifumi, and some "blatant plot holes" towards the conclusion, he praised Michi Random for putting the focus on Iori and showing the main cast being "strong-willed and determined" in their latest predicament, calling it "a fitting endcap to a light, but likable school drama, and brings this saga to a satisfying close while hinting at more to come."

Fellow ANN editor Rebecca Silverman reviewed the first volume of the 2011 manga adaptation in 2014. She wrote that it felt "decidedly underwhelming" with CUTEG's "cute and attractive" illustrations failing to portray the "emotional pull" and body swap moments of the previous works, concluding that: "I really enjoyed the anime and was excited to read this, but it fell far short of the mark with confusing body switches and art that's more cute than useful."

Notes

References

External links
Light novel official website 
Anime official website 
Manga official website 
Visual novel official website 

2010 Japanese novels
2010 manga
2012 anime television series debuts
2012 controversies
2012 manga
2013 anime OVAs
Anime and manga based on light novels
Anime and manga controversies
Banpresto games
Casting controversies in television
Fiction about body swapping
Enterbrain manga
Famitsu Bunko
J-Novel Club books
Japan-exclusive video games
Kadokawa Dwango franchises
Kadokawa Shoten manga
Light novels
Novels about spirit possession
Paranormal novels
PlayStation Portable games
PlayStation Portable-only games
Romantic comedy anime and manga
School life in anime and manga
Seinen manga
Sentai Filmworks
Seven Seas Entertainment titles
Silver Link
Supernatural anime and manga
Television shows based on light novels
Video games developed in Japan
Visual novels